Ali Cengiz Oyunu is a 1971 Turkish romance film, directed by Halit Refiğ and starring Izzet Günay, Gülistan Güzey, and Hulusi Kentmen.

References

External links
Ali Cengiz Oyunu at the Internet Movie Database

1971 films
Turkish romantic drama films
1971 romantic drama films
Films directed by Halit Refiğ
Films about twin brothers
Remakes of Indian films